Chak No.535/GB Pathanwala is a village in the Faisalabad district of Punjab, Pakistan, Pakistan. The village is located near Samandari road.

Villages in Faisalabad District